Nalbari (Pron: nɔ:lˈbɑ:ri) is an administrative district in the state of Assam in India. The district headquarters is located at Nalbari.Th

e origin of Nalbari District is created from Nal+ Bar.

History
Nalbari was declared a sub division of undivided Kamrup District in 1967. The district was created on 14 August 1985 when it was split from Kamrup district. 1 June 2004 saw the formation of Baksa District from parts of three districts, including Nalbari.

Geography
The tributaries of the Brahmaputra, the Nona, Buradia, Pagaldia, Ghogra, Borolia and Tihu, which originate in the foothills of the Himalayan Range, are wild in nature and make an enormous contribution to the agrarian economy of the district.

Administration
Gitimoni Phukan is the current deputy commissioner of Nalbari district.

Demographics
According to the 2011 census Nalbari district has a population of 771,639,  This gives it a ranking of 488th in India (out of a total of 640). Its population growth rate over the decade 2001-2011 was  11.74%. Nalbari has a sex ratio of 945 females for every 1000 males, and a literacy rate of 79.89%. Scheduled Castes and Scheduled Tribes made up 7.80% and 3.03% of the population respectively. 

Hindu population in the district is 491,582 (63.71%), while Muslim population is 277,488 (35.96%) according to 2011 census. Way back in 1971, Hindus were overwhelming majority in Nalbari district with forming 83.7% of the population, while Muslims were 15.4% at that time. For upcoming 2021 census, it was predicted that the district will become muslim-majority as the Muslim population may have exceeded more than 50 percent population as reported by some demographic research centers.

According to the 2011 census, 85.87% of the population spoke Assamese, 11.00% Bengali and 2.53% Boro as their first language while other constitute 0.61% of the total population.

Religious places
Billeswar Devalaya
Billeswar Devalaya in Belsor of Nalbari district is an ancient Hindu temple and is dedicated to Lord Shiva.

 Balilecha (Balilesa) Kali Mandir

It's an ancient temple of Goddess Kali. Although the ancient temple is in ruins, a newly constructed temple stands tall at the site. It's a highly revered religious shrine of Nalbari district. 
Basudev Devalaya
Basudev Devalaya in Balikaria of Nalbari district is an ancient Hindu temple and is dedicated to Basudev.
Ganga Pukhuri
Ganga Pukhuri is a large pond situated in Barkuriha of Nalbari district. Every year there is a festival held in Ganga Pukhuri on Ashok Astami and devotees throng here from different parts of the country to pay homages to departed souls.
Thetha Gohain Than
Thetha Gohain Than in Dokoha of Nalbari district is a Hindu temple dedicated to Lord Krishna.

Education
The rate of total literacy of the Nalbari District, according to 2011 census, is 79.89% as against 80.95% in 2001. The rural literacy rate is 78.44%, while the urban rate is 91.46%. Male literacy is 85.58% consisting of Rural 84.38% and Urban 95.24%. Female literacy is 73.85% consisting of Rural 72.14% and Urban 87.48%. The total literacy rate of the state as a whole is 73.18%.

See also
Villages of Nalbari District

References

External links
 Nalbari District administration
 https://www.knowledgeassam.com/2023/02/nalbari-district-name-is-the-feelings.html

 
Districts of Assam
1985 establishments in Assam
Kamrup region